Blitar Train Station is a railway station in the district of Kepanjenkidul, Kepanjenkidul, Blitar, East Java, Indonesia. It was opened in 1882 by the Dutch East Indies government, making it one of the oldest railway stations in East Java. 

There is a locomotive depot and a former turntable at this station. There is a statue and photo of the first President of Indonesia, Soekarno, inside the station, as he was buried in Blitar.

Services
The railway services that stopped at this station:
 Brantas, to  via 
 Gajayana, to  via  and 
 Brawijaya, to  via  and 
 Kahuripan, to 
 Majapahit, to  via  and 
 Singasari, to  via 
 Matarmaja, to  via  and 
 Penataran, to  via 
 Rapih Dhoho, to  via

Gallery

References

External links
 

Blitar
Railway stations in East Java
Railway stations opened in 1882